Steuri Glacier is a glacier descending the southern slopes of Mount Takahe in Marie Byrd Land. The feature is 3.5 nautical miles (6 km) west of Moll Spur. Mapped by United States Geological Survey (USGS) from surveys and U.S. Navy aerial photography, 1959–66. Named by Advisory Committee on Antarctic Names (US-ACAN) for Heinrich Steuri (University of Bern, Switzerland), United States Antarctic Research Program (USARP) glaciologist at Byrd Station, 1968–69.

References

Glaciers of Marie Byrd Land